The Mariz e Barros-class ironclads were a pair of armored corvettes originally ordered by Paraguay in 1864, but were sold to Brazil when Paraguay defaulted on the payments. Configured as central-battery ironclads, they served during the 1864–70 Paraguayan War between Brazil, Argentina and Uruguay against Paraguay. They were named after Antônio Carlos de Mariz e Barros (1835–1866), son of Joaquim José Inácio, Viscount of Inhaúma, Brazilian military officer and hero of the Paraguayan War.

Design and description
They displaced . The Mariz e Barros class had a pair of steam engines, each driving one propeller. They carried  of coal although nothing is known about their range or endurance. They were fully rigged with three masts. Their crew consisted of 125 officers and enlisted men.

Mariz e Barros was armed with two 120-pounder Whitworth rifled muzzle-loading guns and two smoothbore 68-pounder guns, while Herval had four 120-pounder guns.

Ships

See also 
 List of ironclads

Footnotes

References
 

 
 

Ironclad warships of the Brazilian Navy
Corvettes of the Brazilian Navy